Halanaerobium salsuginis is a strictly anaerobic, Gram-negative, moderately halophilic, non-spore-forming and non-motile bacterium from the genus of Halanaerobium.

References

Clostridia
Bacteria described in 1994